Rajagiriya Grama Niladhari Division is a Grama Niladhari Division of the Sri Jayawardanapura Kotte Divisional Secretariat of Colombo District of Western Province, Sri Lanka. It has Grama Niladhari Division Code 514B.

Welikadawatte, Rajagiriya Flyover, President's College, Sri Jayawardenapura Kotte, Institute of Chemistry Ceylon, Election Commission of Sri Lanka, Altitude (building) and Hewavitharana Maha Vidyalaya are located within, nearby or associated with Rajagiriya.

Rajagiriya is a surrounded by the Welikada East, Ethulkotte West, Koswatta, Welikada North and Welikada West Grama Niladhari Divisions.

Demographics

Ethnicity 

The Rajagiriya Grama Niladhari Division has a Sinhalese majority (57.6%) and a significant Moor population (33.6%). In comparison, the Sri Jayawardanapura Kotte Divisional Secretariat (which contains the Rajagiriya Grama Niladhari Division) has a Sinhalese majority (84.8%)

Religion 

The Rajagiriya Grama Niladhari Division has a Buddhist majority (51.5%) and a significant Muslim population (34.3%). In comparison, the Sri Jayawardanapura Kotte Divisional Secretariat (which contains the Rajagiriya Grama Niladhari Division) has a Buddhist majority (77.1%)

Gallery

References 

Grama Niladhari Divisions of Kotte Divisional Secretariat